Taylor Fritz was the defending champion but chose not to defend his title.

Peter Gojowczyk won the title after defeating Omar Jasika 6–3, 6–1 in the final.

Seeds

Draw

Finals

Top half

Bottom half

References
Main Draw
Qualifying Draw

City of Onkaparinga ATP Challenger - Singles